Bae Jeong-min is a South Korean voice actress.

She joined the Munhwa Broadcasting Corporation's voice acting division in 1999.

Roles

Broadcast TV
Magical DoReMi (Korea TV Edition, MBC)
Doraemon (Korea TV Edition, MBC)
Bikkuriman (Bumerang Fighter, Korea TV Edition, MBC)
Atlantis King (MBC)
Fairy World Adventure (MBC)
Jimmy Neutron (Korea TV Edition, MBC)
Tommy & Oscar (Korea TV edition, MBC)
Fruits Basket (Korea TV Edition, AniOne)
The Cat returns Plays as Yuki the cat (2002)
Oh! Mikey Plays Laura

Movie dubbing
Crayon Shin Chan (Movie edition, Korea TV edition, MBC)

See also
Munhwa Broadcasting Corporation
MBC Voice Acting Division

Homepage
Daum Cafe Voice Actor Bae Jeong-min Fan Cafe 
MBC Voice Acting Division Bae Jeong-min Blog 

1974 births
Living people
South Korean Roman Catholics
South Korean voice actresses